Columbia Cross Roads is an unincorporated community in Bradford County, Pennsylvania, United States. Columbia Cross Roads has a post office with ZIP code 16914.

References

Unincorporated communities in Bradford County, Pennsylvania
Unincorporated communities in Pennsylvania